Don Doran is a retired American soccer defender who played professional in the Major Indoor Soccer League.

In 1977, the St. Louis Stars of the North American Soccer League drafted Doran, but did not sign him.  He then played for St. Louis Kutis until he signed with the St. Louis Steamers of the Major Indoor Soccer League in 1980.  In 1980, he was drafted by the California Sunshine of the American Soccer League.  He may not have played for them.  He did play amateur soccer in St. Louis with the Costa Mesa Cowboys in 1981.  In 1982, he signed with the Los Angeles Lazers of MISL.

In 2009, Doran was inducted into the St. Louis Soccer Hall of Fame.

See also
Football in the United States
List of football clubs in the United States

References

External links
 MISL stats

Soccer players from St. Louis
American soccer players
Association football defenders
Los Angeles Lazers players
Major Indoor Soccer League (1978–1992) players
Saint Louis Billikens men's soccer players
St. Louis Steamers (original MISL) players
St. Louis Kutis players
Living people
1954 births